The 2009 German Athletics Championships were held at the Donaustadion in Ulm on 4–5 July 2009.

Results

Men

Women

References 

 Results source:

External links 
 Deutscher Leichtathletik-Verband 

2009
German Athletics Championships
German Athletics Championships